William Charlton (4 January 1912 – 1998) was an English footballer who played at centre-forward in the Football League for various clubs in the 1930s, including Southampton, Hull City and Queens Park Rangers. He also played for the Corinthians and the England national amateur football team.

Football career
Charlton was born in the South Stoneham area of Southampton and was educated at Peter Symonds School, Winchester before going up to St Edmund Hall at the University of Oxford where he represented Oxford University at football and won his blue.

While still at university, he joined Southampton of the Football League Second Division as an amateur, making two appearances at centre-forward; on 16 January 1932 in a 3–3 draw with Preston North End and on 13 February 1932 when he scored a consolation goal in a 5–1 defeat at Wolverhampton Wanderers.

Between 1933 and 1936, Charlton was a member of the Corinthian amateur club, for whom he made 20 appearances, scoring 16 goals, including two against Stade Francais in Paris in April 1934.

In November 1934, he joined Hull City scoring once in three league appearances, before a spell with Wimbledon. In May 1936, he signed his first professional contract with Queens Park Rangers and played 20 matches, scoring ten goals, in the Football League Third Division South.

He earned his first England amateur cap in 1936, making four appearances in total and scoring three goals, a hat-trick against Ireland.

Later career
During  Second World War, William Charlton was in Royal Navy-Lt.Commander. After the war, Charlton worked for various Oil companies including Shell Mex before retiring to Barnes, He died in 1998.

References

External links
Career details on www.11v11.com

1912 births
Footballers from Southampton
Year of death missing
People educated at Peter Symonds College
Alumni of St Edmund Hall, Oxford
English footballers
Association football forwards
Southampton F.C. players
Corinthian F.C. players
Oxford University A.F.C. players
Hull City A.F.C. players
Wimbledon F.C. players
Queens Park Rangers F.C. players
Barnet F.C. players
Leyton F.C. players
Fulham F.C. players
England amateur international footballers
Schoolteachers from Hampshire
People from South Stoneham
Royal Navy officers of World War II